James Laube is an American wine critic, writing for Wine Spectator since 1980, a full-time staff writer since 1983, with expertise on California wine. Laube has published the books California's Great Cabernets, California's Great Chardonnays, and California Wine containing nearly 700 winery profiles with chapters on California wine history, grapes and wine styles, which won the 1996 James Beard Award for best wine book of the year.

TCA taint controversy
A Wine Spectator report by Laube that Chateau Montelena wine was tainted by TCA, was followed by a great deal of controversy, and the contention that Laube is able to detect TCA at much lower levels than most people. In a letter to the San Francisco Chronicle, Steve Heimoff, an editor of a competing wine magazine Wine Enthusiast, wrote that Laube's position as a critic in a prominent magazine should be more cautious about branding wines as being tainted when most wine drinkers do not have the same level of sensitivity to detect anything wrong with those wines.

Influence on California wine
As the lead reviewer of wines from California for Wine Spectator, Laube's influence over the California wine industry has been compared to that of the Wine Advocate's Robert M. Parker, Jr. Laube's preference for high alcohol, full bodied wines that have been aged in oak has been charged by some critics as a possible reason for the high numbers of that style of wine being produced in California.

See also
 List of wine personalities

References

External links
 James Laube profile Wine Spectator

Year of birth missing (living people)
Living people
Wine critics
James Beard Foundation Award winners